Paragorgopis euryale is a species of ulidiid or picture-winged fly in the genus Paragorgopis of the family Tephritidae.

References

euryale
Insects described in 2004